Fentress may refer to:

People 

Curtis W. Fentress, (born 1947), American architect, founded Fentress Architects in Denver, Colorado
Elizabeth Fentress (born 1948), Roman archaeologist who specialises in Italy and North Africa
John Fentress Gardner (1912–1998), American author and educator

Places 

Fentress, Texas, unincorporated community in Caldwell County, Texas, United States
Fentress County, Tennessee, county in the U.S. state of Tennessee
National Register of Historic Places listings in Fentress County, Tennessee
Naval Auxiliary Landing Field Fentress, U.S. military use airport in Fentress, Chesapeake, Virginia

Other 

Fentress Architects, international design studio
USS Fentress (AK-180), Alamosa-class cargo ship acquired by the U.S. Navy during the final months of World War II

See also
Ventress (disambiguation)